Giorgi is a Georgian masculine given name being the most popular name in Georgia. It may refer to:

Given name 

 Giorgi Asanidze (born 1975), Georgian weightlifter
 Giorgi Baramia (born 1966), Georgian diplomat
 Giorgi Baramidze (born 1968), Georgian politician
 Giorgi Chogovadze (born 1969), Soviet diver
 Giorgi Demetradze (born 1976), Georgian footballer
 Giorgi Eristavi (1813–1864), Georgian playwright
 Giorgi Gakharia (born 1975), Former Prime Minister of Georgia
 Giorgi Kochorashvili (born 1999), Georgian footballer
 Giorgi Kvirikashvili (born 1967), 12th Prime Minister of Georgia
 Giorgi Latso (born 1978), Georgian-American pianist and composer
 Giorgi Lomaia (born 1979), Georgian footballer
 Giorgi Loria (born 1986), Georgian football player
 Giorgi Makaridze (born 1990), Georgian footballer
 Giorgi Margvelashvili (born 1969), 4th President of Georgia
 Giorgi Matiashvili (born 1977), Georgian major general
 Giorgi Mchedlishvili (born 1992), Georgian footballer
 Giorgi Melikishvili (1918–2002), Georgian historian
 Giorgi Merebashvili (born 1986), Georgian footballer
 Giorgi Nadiradze (footballer) (born 1968), Georgian footballer
 Giorgi Nadiradze (cyclist) (born 1987), Georgian road bicycle racer
 Giorgi Navalovski (born 1986), Georgian footballer
 Giorgi Saakadze (c. 1570–1629), Georgian military commander
 Giorgi Sanaia (1975–2001), Georgian journalist
 Giorgi Shermadini (born 1989), Georgian basketball player
 Giorgi Tsetsadze (born 1974), Georgian football manager

Monarchs 
 Giorgi I (998/1002–1027), king of Georgia 1014-1027
 Giorgi II (c.1054–1112), king of Georgia 1072-1089
 Giorgi III (died 1184), king of Georgia 1156-1184
 Giorgi IV (1192–1223), king of Georgia 1213-1223 
 Giorgi V (1286/1289–1346), king of Georgia 1299-1302 and 1314-1346
 Giorgi VI (died 1313), king of Georgia 1311-1313
 Giorgi VII (died 1405 or 1407), king of Georgia 1393-1407 or 1395-1405
 Giorgi VIII (1417–1476), king of Georgia 1446-1465
 Giorgi IX (died 1539), king of Kartli 1525-1527 or 1525-1534
 Giorgi X (c.1561–1606), king of Kartli 1599-1606
 Giorgi XI (1651–1709), king of Kartli 1676-1688 and 1703-1709
 Giorgi XII (1746-1800), last king of Georgia 1798-1800

See also 
 Georgy (name)
 George (name)
 Giorgio (name)
 Gheorghe
 Giorgi (surname), an Italian surname
 List of Georgian monarchs, until Russian annexation in 1801
 George (disambiguation)
 Zorzi (surname)
 Giorgi (disambiguation)